Dikete Tampungu (born 16 April 1980) is a Congolese football goalkeeper. He currently plays for Mpumalanga Black Aces in South Africa and has previously played for Bush Bucks and Bay United in South Africa.

He was a member of the Congolese 2006 African Nations Cup team, who progressed to the quarter finals, where they were eliminated by Egypt, who eventually won the tournament.

References

External links

1980 births
Living people
Democratic Republic of the Congo footballers
Democratic Republic of the Congo international footballers
2006 Africa Cup of Nations players
Association football goalkeepers
Democratic Republic of the Congo expatriate footballers
Democratic Republic of the Congo expatriate sportspeople in South Africa
Bush Bucks F.C. players
Expatriate soccer players in South Africa
Bay United F.C. players
21st-century Democratic Republic of the Congo people